Fred Higgins (died 1960s),  known as Daddy Cleanhead, was an American singer. He was known for singing "Something's Goin' On In My Room" (1954). Gary Susman of The Boston Phoenix describes the record an "obscure gem".

He was the older brother of Chuck Higgins and regularly sang vocals with his brother's band.

He was recorded with them on the following singles
 "Broke" / "I'll Be There" (1954)
 "One More Time" / "Dye Ooh Mambo" (1954)
 "Papa Charlie"  (1954)
 "Something's Goin' On In My Room" / "Let Me Come Back Home" (1955) Specialty Records
 "Shotgun Wedding"

and on the following songs from albums
 Big Fat Mama (1974)
 Papa Charlie (2006)
 Real Gone Hound Dog (2006)

and is included in the compilation
 Cool Daddy—The Central Avenue Scene 1951-1957, Vol.3

References

External links
 Crossed Combs Shows the inclusion of "Something’s Goin’ On In My Room" in the compilation Keb Darge & Paul Weller - Lost & Found - Real R’N'B & Soul
 Keb Darge & Paul Weller - Real RNb and Soul
 Paul Weller helps out with soul compilation

Year of birth missing
1960s deaths
American male singers